Methylpyridinium is a chemical compound which is the quaternary ammonium compound derived from the N-methylation of pyridine.  It is found in some coffee products. It is not present in unroasted coffee beans, but is formed during roasting from its precursor chemical, trigonelline. It is under investigation by scientists regarding its potential anti-carcinogenic properties, particularly an effect on colon cancer.

Ionic liquid

The chloride of N-methylpyridinium behaves as an ionic liquid in the molten state. Its properties with different mixtures of zinc chloride have been characterised by several authors in the temperature range .

See also
 Pyridinium
 4-Caffeoyl-1,5-quinide

References 

Pyridinium compounds
Ionic liquids
Cations